Katrina Orpwood ) is an Australian synchronized swimmer who competed in the 2000 Summer Olympics.

References

1974 births
Living people
Australian synchronised swimmers
Olympic synchronised swimmers of Australia
Synchronized swimmers at the 2000 Summer Olympics